"Mirage" is a song by the American rock and roll group Tommy James and the Shondells, released as a single on 5 January 1967 on the Roulette Records label.

Background
"Mirage" was recorded for the I Think We're Alone Now album.

During a songwriting session producer Bo Gentry accidentally inserted a master copy of the "I Think We're Alone Now" song backwards in his reel-to-reel tape player.  Tommy and the group instantly liked the reverse chord progression and recorded it as "Mirage" with new lyrics by Ritchie Cordell, who had also written "I Think We're Alone Now".

Charts
"Mirage" debuted on the Hot 100 on Tommy's 20th birthday, eventually reaching number 10 on 17 June 1967, number 2 on the Canadian charts on 24 June 1967, and number one on the Chicago AM radio stations WCFL on 18 May 1967 and WLS on 19 May 1967.

Cover versions
Pop-punk band The Queers covered "Mirage" on their 1994 album Beat Off.

References

External links
tommyjames.com

1967 songs
1967 singles
Songs written by Ritchie Cordell
Tommy James and the Shondells songs
Roulette Records singles